Scorch is an American television sitcom that aired on CBS in 1992, and was canceled after three episodes were broadcast.

The title character, a miniature dragon, is a puppet that was used by ventriloquist Ronn Lucas before the series came to be; although Lucas never actually appeared in the series, he did supply Scorch's voice.

Cast
Jonathan Walker as Brian Stevens
John O'Hurley as Howard Gurman
Brenda Strong as Allison King
Rhea Silver-Smith as Jessica Stevens
Todd Susman as Jack Fletcher

Premise
Scorch, a small 1,300-year-old dragon, awakens from a 100-year sleep in 1992. While flying around, he's struck by lightning and he crash-lands in front of the apartment of Brian Stevens (Jonathan Walker) and his daughter Jessica (Rhea Silver-Smith). The next day, as a result of awkward circumstances, Brian lands a job as a TV weatherman at New Haven, Connecticut television station WWEN-TV by pretending that he's a ventriloquist and Scorch is his puppet; no one except Brian and Jessica knows that Scorch is a real dragon.

Episodes
Six episodes were made, but only three were aired.

External links
 

1992 American television series debuts
1992 American television series endings
1990s American sitcoms
CBS original programming
English-language television shows
American television shows featuring puppetry
Television series by Lorimar Television
Television shows set in Connecticut
Television series about dragons
Television series by Saban Entertainment